Jeong Changhwa (7 July 1940 – 15 February 2022) was a South Korean politician. A member of the Democratic Justice Party and later the Grand National Party, he served in the National Assembly from 1981 to 1992 and again from 1998 to 2004. He died on 15 February 2022, at the age of 81.

References

1940 births
2022 deaths
20th-century South Korean politicians
21st-century South Korean politicians
Members of the National Assembly (South Korea)
Democratic Justice Party politicians
Liberty Korea Party politicians
Yonsei University alumni
South Korean Protestants
People from Uiseong County